The commune of Muhanga is a commune of Kayanza Province in northern Burundi. The capital lies at Muhanga. In 2007, DGHER electrified one rural village in the commune.

References

Communes of Burundi
Kayanza Province